The phrase Shirt of Flame refers either to a specific form of the poison dress trope in folklore, or to a particular type of clothing given to people about to face burning at the stake.

Pre-Christian, non-Christian, and magical usage

Greek mythology

Glauce and Medea
Creusa (daughter of Creon) drew the attentions and favor of the hero Jason, and in revenge the sorceress Medea gave her a shirt or dress to wear, which Medea had cursed to stick to her body and burn her to death.
They [Jason and Medea] went to Corinth, and lived there happily for ten years, till Creon, king of Corinth, betrothed his daughter Glauce to Jason, who married her and divorced Medea. But she invoked the gods by whom Jason had sworn, and after often upbraiding him with his ingratitude she sent the bride a robe steeped in poison, which when Glauce had put on, she was consumed with fierce fire along with her father, who went to her rescue.

Heracles

Heracles, who was both a hero and god, was killed by the Shirt of Nessus, which was also a Shirt of Fire. Heracles used an arrow poisoned with the blood of a Lernaean Hydra to kill the Centaur Nessus. As he lay dying, Nessus told the wife of Heracles, Deianeira, that a shirt stained with his blood would insure the faithfulness of her husband. She gave the shirt, a chiton, to Heracles, and when he put it on, the poisoned shirt began to burn him so much, that he made his own funeral pyre and leaped upon it.

Arthurian legend
According to legend, a cursed mantle was among the items used by Morgan Le Fey to attempt to kill King Arthur. 
The next morning there arrived a damsel at the Court with a message from Morgan le Fay, saying that she had sent the King her brother a rich mantle for a gift, covered with precious stones, and begged him to receive it and to forgive her in whatever she might have offended him. The King answered little, but the mantle pleased him, and he was about to throw it over his shoulders when the lady of the lake stepped forward, and begged that she might speak to him in private. 'What is it?' asked the King. 'Say on here, and fear nothing.' 'Sir,' said the lady, 'do not put on this mantle, or suffer your Knights to put it on, till the bringer of it has worn it in your presence.' 'Your words are wise,' answered the King, 'I will do as you counsel me. Damsel, I desire you to put on this mantle that you have brought me, so that I may see it.' 'Sir,' said she, 'it does not become me to wear a King's garment.' 'By my head,' cried Arthur, 'you shall wear it before I put it on my back, or on the back of any of my Knights,' and he signed to them to put it on her, and she fell down dead, burnt to ashes by the enchanted mantle. Then the King was filled with anger, more than he was before, that his sister should have dealt so wickedly by him.

Christian usage

Roman martyrs

During the Persecution of Christians in the Roman Empire, many early Christians were executed by being doused with tar, pitch and oil, and set alight in Rome. According to Tacitus, the Roman Emperor Nero used Christians as human torches. As such, they martyrs wore the metaphorical "Shirt of Flame" as they were consumed.
Often they were stripped and forced to wear a Tunica molesta or "annoying shirt" that was impregnated with oil, that was also a "Shirt of Flame". "The tunica molesta, or flaming shirt, was commonly used to execute criminals in ancient Greece and Rome."

Roman Catholic

In Roman Catholic countries such as France, Italy and Spain, heretics after their trial were confined until the execution. The shirt of flame in the auto-da-fe under the Inquisition also was worn at different times through the centuries. Often the outfit for those to be burned were funny hats, and a shirt or tabard with flames, and sometimes imps and demons, sewn upon them. These images were used to terrify the convicted heretics, as well to subject them to ridicule and abuse as they were paraded to the place of execution. 

In Spain, special clothing such as the sanbenito was worn as part of their penance. Often made of yellow or faded sackcloth, these shirts used special symbols, including the Cross of Saint Andrew, for the convicted. The humiliation of the shirt of flame outfit was part of the punishment, and also was used to warn others of the penalties of nonconformity in faith, speech and practice.
Heretics were often people who did not conform to church teachings or doctrine. Many of them remained Catholic in most of their beliefs, but felt that they had betrayed that church or strayed from the church's teachings. Unlike areas with larger Protestant communities, the heretics were shamed and humiliated, rather than seeing themselves as martyrs to the Protestant religion. The shirt of flame worn by these men and women was never a gown of pride or sacrifice, but of despair.

Protestantism

Protestant martyrs in England
Under the De heretico comburendo of 1401, heretics in England would be executed by burning at the stake. Many Protestants were later sentenced to "death by burning" in 16th-century England because of their faith. A number of them were ministers to small congregations, who were arrested and tried for heresy. Sometimes, they were given a special "Shirt of Flame" to wear under their clothes. Then, just before their execution, they were stripped to their underclothes, which would be this special shirt. 

When he was sentenced to death by burning, John Bradford was give a special shirt by a Mrs. Marlet, for whom he had previously written a devotional work. This was a clean shirt that was sewn specifically for the burning, made in the style of a wedding shirt. "This clothing with a new shirt to wear at the stake became a common feature at the burnings, a way of signaling support for and honouring the victim, as though he were being dressed as a bridegroom for a wedding." Also, the ceremonial donning of the shirt of flame could be seen as similar to the priest donning his vestments, thus subverting Catholic ritual. "...and so the martyr might pray over and kiss the shirt before putting it on... underlining their oneness with Christ and the fact they were willing to die..."

Biblical references
The white gown or Shirt of Flame used by Protestant martyrs was modeled in part on the long white garments worn by the martyrs "of the great tribulation" in heaven, as mentioned in chapter seven of the Bible's Book of Revelation. "9 After this I beheld, and, lo, a great multitude, which no man could number, of all nations, and kindreds, and people, and tongues, stood before the throne, and before the Lamb, clothed with white robes, and palms in their hands... 13 And one of the elders answered, saying unto me, What are these which are arrayed in white robes? and whence came they? 14 And I said unto him, Sir, thou knowest. And he said to me, These are they which came out of great tribulation, and have washed their robes, and made them white in the blood of the Lamb."

In popular culture
Oscar Wilde, in his letter "De Profundis," written from prison, writes: "The martyr in his shirt of flame may be looking on the face of God, but to him who is piling the faggots or loosening the logs for the blast the whole scene is no more than the slaying of an ox is to the butcher, or the felling of a tree is to the charcoal burner in the forest, or the fall of a flower to one who is mowing down the grass with a scythe."

T. S. Eliot, after his conversion to Anglicanism, wrote in "Little Gidding" (one of his Four Quartets): "Love is the unfamiliar Name / Behind the hands that wove / The intolerable shirt of flame / Which human power cannot remove."

References

Shirts
People executed by the Kingdom of England by burning
Protestant martyrs of England
Textiles in folklore